Ubisoft Reflections Limited (formerly Reflections and later Reflections Interactive Limited) is a British video game developer and a studio of Ubisoft based in Newcastle upon Tyne. Founded in 1984 by Martin Edmondson and Nicholas Chamberlain, the studio focuses on racing games and it is best known for creating the award-winning Driver series. Reflections was acquired by GT Interactive in 1998 and sold to Ubisoft in 2006. The company works on AAA games in close cooperation with sister studio Ubisoft Leamington.

History 
Martin Edmondson and Nicholas Chamberlain started developing games for the BBC Micro under the moniker "Reflections" in 1984. Their first game was a Paperboy clone called Paper-Round that took two years to develop but was never released. While working on that game, they started Ravenskull which would be their first published game, released in 1986 by Superior Software. This was followed by Codename: Droid and an Acorn Electron conversion of Stryker's Run in 1987.

The name Reflections was first used for their 1989 hit Amiga game, Shadow of the Beast, published by Psygnosis which spawned two sequels. The original Amiga game was partially written by Paul Howarth, and started out life as a parallax test of the blitter of the Amiga's Agnus chip; Paul later went on to work for Deep Red Games, a UK video game company based in Milton Keynes. A number of other Amiga and Atari ST games followed including Ballistix (1989), Awesome (1990) and Brian the Lion (1994). In 1995, they became known for Destruction Derby, which was critically acclaimed for its realistic physics and destruction, which later become Reflections' specialty. Due to the success, the game had four more sequels over the years.

Reflections became well known for the game Driver, which was inspired by '70s cop shows like Starsky and Hutch and movies like Bullitt and The Driver. It has been followed by four sequels and four spin-offs. The company was subsequently renamed Reflections Interactive.

In 2004, studio founder Martin Edmondson left Reflections after the concepting stage of Driver: Parallel Lines, and sued Atari due to "constructive unfair dismissal as a result of Reflections alleged repudiatory breach of a contract of employment that necessitated Mr. Edmondson's resignation." Martin's brother, Gareth Edmondson, took his place as the studio manager.

Gareth Edmondson, studio manager, left Reflections after more than a ten-year presence at the studio in November 2011, two months after the launch of Driver: San Francisco. The studio was then headed by Pauline Jacquey from February 2014. The studio was then headed by Richard Blenkinsop until they left the company in 2021. Lisa Opie was appointed as managing director in May 2021.

May 2013, Ubisoft Reflections announced that they are working on a new game, Ubisoft planned to announce the game at E3 2013. On 10 June 2013, during an Ubisoft's press conference it was revealed that Reflections was working with developer Ivory Tower on the racing game The Crew, which was later released in December 2014.

Games developed

References

External links 
 

1984 establishments in England
Companies based in Newcastle upon Tyne
British companies established in 1984
Video game companies established in 1984
Driver (video game series)
Ubisoft divisions and subsidiaries
Video game companies of the United Kingdom
Video game development companies
2006 mergers and acquisitions
British subsidiaries of foreign companies